David K. Thomson (born 1967/1968) is an American attorney and jurist serving as a justice of the New Mexico Supreme Court.

Early life and education

Thomson was born and raised in Santa Fe, New Mexico. He earned a Bachelor of Arts from Wesleyan University and his Juris Doctor from the University of Denver School of Law.

Career 
He was admitted to the State Bar of New Mexico in 1999. After graduating law school, he worked as a sole practitioner in Santa Fe and clerked under Judge Bruce D. Black of the United States District Court for the District of New Mexico. He previously worked for more than a decade in the New Mexico Attorney General's Office, where he served as deputy attorney general and director of the litigation division.

State court service

Thomson was appointed to the District Court by Governor Bill Richardson. He served as a district court judge in the first judicial district from 2014 until his elevation to the Supreme Court.

New Mexico Supreme Court

In December 2018, Thomson was one of fourteen applicants who applied for two upcoming vacancies on the New Mexico Supreme Court. On January 11, 2019, the nominating commission submitted his name along with six others to fill the vacancies. On January 25, 2019, Governor Michelle Lujan Grisham announced her selection of Thomson to fill the vacancy left by the retirement of Petra Jimenez Maes. He was sworn in on February 4, 2019.

Personal life 

Thomson is a registered Democrat.

References

External links

Living people
1960s births
New Mexico Democrats
New Mexico lawyers
New Mexico state court judges
Justices of the New Mexico Supreme Court
University of Denver alumni
Wesleyan University alumni
20th-century American lawyers
21st-century American judges